Paul Joseph Cini (born ) is a Canadian plane hijacker who is noted as the first person to plan a skyjacking with a planned escape by use of a parachute. In November 1971 Cini boarded Air Canada Flight 812, and—posing as an international terrorist—proceeded to hijack the plane. During the next eight hours, the plane made several mid-air diversions from its original flight plan that included a stop in the United States in order to pickup ransom money. Cini, who often became agitated during the event, was kept calm by a flight attendant, Mary Dohey, who had a psychological background before working for the airline. The hijacker was overpowered by Dohey and two additional members of the flight crew when he attempted to bail from the plane over the Alberta, Canada, wilderness.

Background
While watching a news story about an unsuccessful hijacking, 27-year-old Calgary truck driver, Paul Cini, developed the idea of commandeering an airliner that featured a novel approach to escaping justice: he planned to evade capture by parachuting into the Canadian wilderness instead of landing with the plane. Although he was deathly afraid of heights, Cini later stated that he thought that receiving a ransom and escaping into the wilderness was his one chance to escape what he considered to be a lacklustre life with low prospects. He picked Air Canada Flight 812 that was utilizing an Air Canada DC-8,<ref name="Idea">Paul Joseph Cini Hijacked a Plane Because He Had an Idea: Parachuting; WebPage: Slate.com; text: He had a shotgun, dynamite, a collapsible shovel, a pup tent, candy bars, and a dark-blue parachute. What could go wrong?; retrieved 27 November 2022; Text: Paul Joseph Cini would be remembered not as the world’s first “parajacker” but as a fool ... The Upshot: The fame that Cini so desperately craved would instead go the fabled D.B. Cooper, who jumped out of a Northwest Orient Airlines jet 11 days later and was never seen again..."</ref> on a regularly scheduled flight from Vancouver to Toronto via one stop at Calgary, as his target.

The hijacking
On 13 November 1971, Cini boarded the airliner at its scheduled first stop in Calgary, Alberta, Canada. He had prepared for his actions by bringing several items with him in his luggage. His equipment included: a sawed-off shotgun, two bundles of dynamite, rope, a black hood, a makeshift parachute wrapped with cord, and camping equipment for survival in the wilderness following his planned exit from the plane.

After consuming several alcoholic drinks, Cini, posing as an Irish Republican Army (IRA) terrorist seeking refuge and safe passage to Northern Ireland, retrieved several weapons from his luggage, donned his black hood, and proceeded to hijack the plane. With the use of a shotgun and a bag filled with dynamite, Cini convinced Flight Attendant Mary Dohey of his intentions. Dohey, who had trained as a psychiatric nurse before becoming a flight attendant, managed to calm the often highly-agitated Cini during the eight-hour ordeal, even though she was forced by Cini to maintain pressure on the bomb trigger that kept two hot electrical wires apart during the entirety of the event.

Dohey brought the hijacker's demands to Flight Captain Vernon Ehman,Mary Dohey: First living person to receive Cross of Valour after Air Canada Hijacking; Clancy, C.J.; 6 October 2021; WebPage; Irish Central Newsletter; retrieved 1 December 2022 who directed the aircraft, carrying 114 passengers and nine crew, to alter its course to Great Falls, Montana where Cini demanded CD$1.5 million as ransom be delivered. Unable to produce that amount of currency quickly, Air Canada gave him a package containing US$50,000, which he accepted, possibly unaware of the shortfall. Cini allowed the release of all the passengers, and most of the crew at Great Falls, before moving forward with his plan. Dohey, however, voluntarily remained onboard due to the calming effect she had on Cini.

Cini ordered the plane to continue on to Phoenix, Arizona, but once in the air, the inebriated skyjacker quickly changed his mind and demanded the plane head back into Canada. Nearing Calgary, Cini put his escape plan into motion, readying the plane to allow his departure by parachute into the Alberta "wilderness", although they were over rurally populated range and farmland at the time. The parachute, however, could not be deployed due to his inability to untie the knot in the twine he had used to secure it. Demanding something to cut through the bindings, a member of the flight crew, John Joseph Arpin, brought him a fire axe. When Cini absent mindedly put the shotgun down to use the axe, Pilot-in-Command Ehman jumped him and Arpin hit him in the head with the axe handle, which fractured his skull and rendered him unconscious. This act brought the hijacking to a swift close.

Aftermath
Cini was eventually arraigned on seven charges, four of which carried a maximum penalty of life imprisonment.Life Sentence Meant to Deter Plane Hijacking; 12 April 1972; "Ottawa Citizen"; retrieved 29 November 2022; p. 17; Text: "...he was slugged unconscious in a wild struggle with the crew as the plane descended virtually blind toward Calgary on a cloudy night..." In April 1972, Cini was convicted of all charges and sentenced to life imprisonment. He was, however, paroled after 10 years (in 1982). In December 1975, for actions taken during the flight, Flight Attendant Dohey was awarded the Cross of Valour for bravery; Flight Purser Arpin received the Canadian Star of Courage; and Captain Ehman received the Medal of Bravery. No other injuries were reported from the event—other than Cini's cracked skull—even though he had at one time accidentally discharged his shotgun during the hijacking.

Legacy
This hijacking was followed just 11 days later with the skyjacking of Northwest Orient Airlines Flight 305, an event that featured what appeared to be another hijacker's successful escape by parachuting out from the plane into the Northwestern United States wilderness. This hijacker was known only by the pseudonym D. B. Cooper.

See also
 List of aircraft hijackings
 Canadian Air Transport Security Authority

Notes

References

Further reading
 Koerner, Brendan I.; The Skies Belong to Us: Love and Terror in the Golden Age of Hijacking''

External links
 B&W newspaper photo of Cini in custody
 Aviation Safety Board record of incident

Hijackers
Parachuting in Canada
November 1971 events in Canada
November 1971 events in the United States
Aviation accidents and incidents in the United States in 1971
20th-century Canadian criminals